The Khon Kaen Light Rail Transit Project is a planned  light rail transit system consisting of an initial 16 stations to serve  Khon Kaen Province in north-east Thailand. A Phase 2  five-station extension is also planned. The line will have both at-grade and elevated sections. Fares are expected to be a flat 15 baht.  Construction is set to begin in 2024.

History
The original plan for mass transit in Khon Kaen consisted of a four line Bus Rapid Transit (BRT) network which was proposed in 2012. By 2014, a master plan for the BRT network had been finalised.

However, in early 2015, Khon Kaen Mayor proposed converting the long North-South Red BRT line into a light rail line as part of Khon Kaen's Smart City development program and to integrate with the future planned North East high speed rail to Nong Khai. By mid 2015, a feasibility study was commissioned for a light rail line. In mid March 2016, the Thai government signed a decree approving the project and provided a budget to complete the feasibility study and design of the project. In March 2017, the Khon Kaen Mayor announced that a private company, Khon Kaen Transit System Co., owned by Khon Kaen City and 4 surrounding municipalities would be established to operate the line.

In July 2017, it was announced that the tender for the project was to be issued and awarded by the end of 2017. However, this did not occur as the feasibility study by Office of Transport and Traffic Policy and Planning (OTP) evaluating the design and operations had not been completed. The OTP study was completed in February 2018 and the project was formally approved by the government in October 2018.

As of December 2018, bidding on the project is scheduled to commence no later than February 2019, with construction beginning immediately after the process concludes within next year.

Lines

Alignment
The LRT line runs on a north-south axis along Mittraphap Road through the center of Khon Kaen city.

See also
 List of urban rail systems in Thailand
 Phuket Island Light Rail Transit

References

Rail transport in Thailand
Proposed rail infrastructure in Thailand
Light rail in Asia